Susan Te Kahurangi King (born 1951) is an autistic artist from New Zealand who found international fame in 2009. She was born in Te Aroha in 1951.

King is a self-taught artist whose ability to speak declined by the age of four, and by the age of eight stopped speaking altogether. She has methodically created an entire analogous world through drawings using pen, graphite, colored pencil, crayon and ink.

In the middle-to-late 1970s, King produced intricate, hypnotic dreamscapes that powerfully blend animals, humans and inanimate objects into networked tapestries. During the 1980s, King began to reduce the representational content of her drawings, instead focusing on diagrammatic compositions with a cell- or map-like structure.  King drew prolifically through to the early 1990s and then for an unknown reason suddenly she stopped. King resumed drawing in 2008 when documentary film maker Dan Salmon began filming her and her art.

Art collector and curator Peter Fay discovered her work and curated a solo show for her in Sydney in 2009. In 2013 King showed at the prestigious Paris Outsider Art Fair. In 2015 she had her first solo US show Drawings from Many Worlds at the Andrew Edlin Gallery in New York. In July 2016, King's debut museum exhibition opened at the Institute of Contemporary Art, Miami. Her work was exhibited at the Marlborough Contemporary gallery in London in 2018 and at the Intuit: The Center for Intuitive and Outsider Art in 2019.

King has public collections held by The Museum of Modern Art, Philadelphia Museum of Art, Chartwell Collection and the James Wallace Arts Trust.

A monograph of King's work was published in 2016 by the Institute of Contemporary Art, Miami. King also contributed to the 2016 anthology of New Zealand women's comics, Three Words.

In 2016 the American Folk Art Museum founded the Susan Te Kahurangi King Fellowship program.

References

New Zealand Māori artists
1951 births
Living people
People from Te Aroha
Outsider artists
Women outsider artists
20th-century New Zealand women artists
21st-century New Zealand women artists
Artists with autism
New Zealand people with disabilities
Ngāti Hauā people